Agdistis asthenes is a moth in the family Pterophoridae. It is known from Mongolia and Kazakhstan.

The wingspan is about 20 mm. The forewings are bright grey and the hindwings are grey.

References

Agdistinae
Moths described in 1970